The Collector of Internal Revenue for the First District of Illinois was an office created by the Revenue Act of 1862, the holder of which was responsible for the collection of income tax in the First District of Illinois, headquartered in Chicago. The First District was the largest tax collection district in the State of Illinois, and numerous important political figures received a patronage appointment to the office. By 1920, the First District had grown to encompass the counties of Boone, Bureau, Carroll, Cook, DeKalb, DuPage, Grundy, Henderson, Henry, Jo Daviess, Kane, Kankakee, Kendall, Knox, Lake, La Salle, Lee, McHenry, Marshall, Mercer, Ogle, Peoria, Putnam, Rock Island, Stark, Stephenson, Warren, Whiteside, Will, and Winnebago. The office was abolished in 1953, following the reorganization of the Bureau of Internal Revenue into the Internal Revenue Service.

Officeholders

Collector of Internal Revenue, 1st District of Illinois, 1862–1953

References

United States Department of the Treasury officials